Pseuderotis is a moth genus of the family Depressariidae.

Species
 Pseuderotis obiterella (Busck, 1908)
 Pseuderotis cannescens Clarke, 1956
 Pseuderotis thamnolopha (Meyrick, 1932)

References

Peleopodinae